Dielmann Creek is a stream in the U.S. state of Missouri. It is a tributary to Monsanto-Sunswept Creek.

Dielmann Creek was named after Emil Dielmann (1897-1974), who settled near its course.

References

Rivers of Missouri
Rivers of St. Louis County, Missouri